Oxberg is a minor locality in Mora Municipality, Sweden. It had 97 inhabitants in 2010. Vasaloppet goes through Oxberg. It is also the start site for Tjejvasan, Kortvasan and Halvvasan. The Oxberg Bridge is also located here.

References

External links

Populated places in Dalarna County